Ukrid is a village in Dulmi community development block, which is a part of Ramgarh district in Jharkhand state, India.

Demographics 
Covering  and comprising 344 households at the time of the 2011 census of India, Ukrid had a population of 2054. There were 1056 males and 998 females, with 330 people being aged six or younger.

The same census recorded a similarly-named place in Patratu tehsil, with an area of  but no inhabitants.

References 

Villages in Ramgarh district